Dennis B. Tiziani is a retired professional golfer and golf coach.

Playing career
He spent three years on the PGA Tour, played in 12 PGA Professional National Championship, three U.S. Opens, and the 1976 PGA Championship.  He finished T51st at the 1976 PGA Championship.

Tiziani won the 1976 Wisconsin State Open. He also is four-time winner of the Wisconsin PGA Championship (1976, 1982, 1984, and 1996).

Coaching career
For 26 years, Tiziani was head coach for the Wisconsin Badgers men's golf team. While there he coached his son Mario Tiziani. He also coached the women's team.

Personal life
He is father-in-law to PGA Tour and PGA Tour Champions Steve Stricker.

Results in major championships

Note: Tiziani never played in the Masters Tournament nor The Open Championship.

CUT = missed the half-way cut
"T" = tied

U.S. national team appearances
PGA Cup: 1976 (winners)

References

External links 

American male golfers
PGA Tour golfers
College golf coaches in the United States
Golfers from Wisconsin
Living people
Year of birth missing (living people)